The Cheshire Cheese is a public house at 5 Little Essex Street,  London WC2, on the corner with Milford Lane.

It is a grade II listed building, rebuilt in 1928 by Nowell Parr on the site of an earlier pub, for the Style & Winch Brewery. There has been a tavern on this site since the 16th century.

References

External links

Buildings by Nowell Parr
Grade II listed pubs in the City of Westminster